Synaphe subolivalis is a species of moth of the family Pyralidae. It was described by Oberthür in 1887. It is found in Morocco.

References

Moths described in 1887
Pyralini
Endemic fauna of Morocco
Moths of Africa